American Lithographic Co. v. Werkmeister, 221 U.S. 603 (1911), was a United States Supreme Court case in which the Court held a corporation defendant in a suit to enforce copyright infringement penalties is not entitled to a Fourth or Fifth Amendment objection to the admission of its bookkeeping entries into evidence when they are produced under a subpoena duces tecum.

References

External links
 

1911 in United States case law
United States Supreme Court cases
United States Supreme Court cases of the White Court
United States copyright case law
United States Fourth Amendment case law
United States Fifth Amendment self-incrimination case law